The Grand Canal Facing Santa Croce is an oil on canvas painting attributed to Bernardo Bellotto, now in the National Gallery in London. It is named after the Church of Santa Croce in the right-hand foreground. Several boats are shown on the Grand Canal, including a burchiello, effectively the link between Venice and Padua.

It probably dates to the late 1730s and based on a drawing by Canaletto (Windsor Castle, Royal Collection) probably produced in the 1730s. It was produced after Canaletto's death by an artist from his studio, probably his nephew and pupil Bernardo Bellotto. A similar view (also in the Royal Collection) was copied in an engraving by Antonio Visentini, whilst the right-hand part of the painting also appears in Santa Croce on the Grand Canal (National Gallery), attributed to an unknown member of Canaletto's studio.

References

1740s paintings
Collections of the National Gallery, London
Paintings by Bernardo Bellotto